Marianne Rivoalen was appointed a judge of the Family Division of the Court of Queen's Bench of Manitoba on February 2, 2005. On May 22, 2015, Rivaolen took over as Associate Chief Justice of the Family Division of the Court of Queen's Bench of Manitoba. She is presently a Justice of the Federal Court of Appeal. 

She received a Bachelor of Laws from the University of Moncton Law School in 1988. She was admitted to the Manitoba Bar in 1989.

References

Judges in Manitoba
Canadian women judges
Living people
Year of birth missing (living people)